The Singapore Women's Masters is an annual women's squash tournament that takes place in Singapore in July. It is part of the WSA World Tour.

Past Results

Women's

See also
WSA World Tour

References

External links
2011 SquashSite Singapore Masters website
WSA Calendar

Women's squash tournaments
Squash in Singapore
Women's sports competitions in Singapore
Squash tournaments in Singapore